Muktzeh  (Hebrew:  "separated") is a concept in Jewish rabbinical law. Muktzeh objects are subject to use restrictions on the Sabbath. The generally accepted view regarding these items is that they may be touched, though not moved, during Shabbat (the Jewish Sabbath) or Yom Tov (Jewish holiday). Some extend this prohibition to the actual handling of these items. Halakha defines various categories of objects or substances which are "set aside" on the Jewish Sabbath, as well as various permissible instances of moving these various muktzeh items. For example, one may not handle money, rocks, twigs, etc. on Shabbat, as these items are muktzeh.

The consensus among the halakhic authorities is that muktzeh is an issur d'rabbanan (a rabbinic prohibition), rather than a d'oreisa (biblical prohibition).

The laws of muktzeh can be divided into two distinct subjects:
 "Muktzeh", i.e. the conditions needed for something to become muktzeh, and the properties of the various categories thereof;
 "Tiltul", i.e. if an item is indeed determined to be muktzeh, it must be determined when and how it may be moved.

General concept 
Muktzeh is essentially a restriction on objects that were not 'prepared' before the Sabbath. The absence of preparedness in this sense means that when Shabbat began, the vast majority of people would not have expected to use this particular item or substance on Shabbat.

Categories 
There are six main categories of muktzeh,<ref>1992 Rabbi Baruch Chait The 39 Avoth Melacha of Shabbat https://www.feldheim.com/ the-39-avoth-melacha-of-shabbath  Page 42</ref> each one with different halakhic ramifications:

 Mechamat Chisaron Kis: delicate objects which one is extremely careful when handling; e.g. a musical instrument or camera.
 Basis: an object supporting a muktzeh item, which takes the same status as the muktzeh item; e.g. the tray holding the Shabbat candles.
 Mechamat Gufo: objects that are not utensils and have no ordinary Shabbat function; e.g. raw foods.
 Mechamat Isura: objects whose use is totally prohibited on Shabbat; at the start of Shabbat, they become muktzeh, remaining muktzeh until the end of Shabbat; e.g. Shabbat candles.
 Kli Shemlachto L'isur: objects designed primarily to perform forbidden work; e.g. a hammer.
 Mechamat Mitzvah: objects used only to perform a non-Shabbat mitzvah; e.g.'' a lulav.

See also 
39 Melakhot, the activities prohibited on Shabbat

References

Laws of Shabbat
Hebrew words and phrases in Jewish law